KJEF (1290 kHz, "Cajun Radio 1290") is an AM radio station broadcasting a Cajun music and swamp pop music format. Licensed to Jennings, Louisiana, United States, the station is owned by Townsquare Media. The station's studios are located on North Lakeshore Drive, just northwest of downtown Lake Charles, and its transmitter is located in Jennings.

The station is an affiliate of the New Orleans Saints radio network.

References

External links
 Official Website
 

JEF (AM)
Radio stations established in 1951
1951 establishments in Louisiana
Townsquare Media radio stations